The Coadou et Fleury was a French automobile manufactured only in 1921.

Made in Paris, it was a small cyclecar featuring a monocoque body and a  sidevalve engine; this last was built by Ruby.

References

 David Burgess Wise, The New Illustrated Encyclopedia of Automobiles.

External links
 Specifications (in French)

Cyclecars
Cars introduced in 1921
Defunct motor vehicle manufacturers of France